Stijn Max Hendrikse is an entrepreneur, author, public speaker, team and executive coach. He is the founder of Amy, a customer service software for Small Businesses, and Kalungi, a global Growth-as-a-Service provider, focused on B2B SaaS companies. As a C-level executive, he has contributed to the success of many SaaS startups, including Acumatica, MightyCall, and Atera.

Before focusing on startups, Hendrikse was at Microsoft where he led global SMB Marketing, the global standardization of the OOXML ISO 29500 open standard for document formats, and Product Marketing for Microsoft Office in the Public Sector and the Small Business segment.

Early life 
Hendrikse grew up in Enschede in The Netherlands. An early interest in computers led to becoming a self-taught coder and software developer, which in turn led to spending the first half of his career at Microsoft.

Career 

After leading consulting and sales in the Netherlands for Microsoft, the software giant brought Hendrikse to its HQ in Redmond in 2004 to lead several global marketing teams.

Over the next 12 years, Hendrikse held a series of C-level positions including Chief Revenue Officer of ERP software maker Acumatica, CEO of SaaS contact center MightyCall, and supporting the initial global Go-to-Market for Atera, a B2B SaaS Unicorn. Stijn also supported some companies as a B2B SaaS Fractional Executive.

He currently leads revenue growth for Browzwear and serves on the board of directors of several tech companies, as well as on that of Kalungi, the B2B SaaS marketing agency he founded in June 2018. 

In addition, he founded Amy, an AI-powered conversation platform.

Works 
To help entrepreneurs and SaaS startups learn from his experience, Hendrikse authored T2D3: How some software startups scale, where many fail.

Since T2D3’s publication, Hendrikse has been leading workshops and serving as a coach/mentor to investors, entrepreneurs, executives, marketing teams, and others.

See also 
 Marketing
 Software as a service
 Marketing strategy
 Acumatica
 Microsoft

References 

Living people
1971 births
21st-century Dutch businesspeople
People from Enschede
Microsoft people
Microsoft employees